Graft is a sculpture by Roxy Paine.
It was installed on October 26–30, 2008, in the National Gallery of Art Sculpture Garden.

It is part of a "Dendroids" series begun in 1998. Made of Stainless steel, it weighs 16,000 pounds.

See also
 List of public art in Washington, D.C., Ward 2

References

2009 sculptures
Collections of the National Gallery of Art
National Gallery of Art Sculpture Garden
Outdoor sculptures in Washington, D.C.
Steel sculptures in Washington, D.C.